The Nurulla Mosque (also spelled Nurullah; Cyrillic: Нурулла́; formerly The Seventh Cathedral Mosque,; /Sennaya, Bazaar Mosque, Yunıs Mosque, The Main Mosque, The White Mosque etc.) is a mosque in Kazan, Russia.

History

It was built in 1845–1849 on the donations of merchant Ğ. M. Yunısov by the project of A. K. Loman. The mosque is two-storied, has a hall with cupola and three-storied cylindrical minaret over the southern entry. The ornament of the mosque is similar to those of medieval Volga Bulgaria and the Middle East. In 1929 the minaret was destroyed, and till 1992 the mosque was used for apartments and offices. In 1992 it was renamed Nurullah and returned to believers. In 1990-1995 the mosque saw a restoration under R. W. Bilalov when the minaret also was restored.

See also
Islam in Tatarstan
Islam in Russia
List of mosques in Russia
List of mosques in Europe

References

Nurulla mosque on "Russian mosques"

Mosques in Kazan
Religious buildings and structures completed in 1849
Closed mosques in the Soviet Union
Mosques in Russia
Mosques in Europe
Cultural heritage monuments of federal significance in Tatarstan